The Kayenta Formation is a geological formation in the Glen Canyon Group that is spread across the Colorado Plateau province of the United States, including northern Arizona, northwest Colorado, Nevada, and Utah. Traditionally has been suggested as Sinemurian-Pliensbachian, but more recent dating of detrital zircons has yielded a depositional age of 183.7 ± 2.7 Ma, thus a Pliensbachian-Toarcian age is more likely A previous depth work recovered a solid Lower-Middle Pliensbachian age from measurements done in the Tenney Canyon.

This rock formation is particularly prominent in southeastern Utah, where it is seen in the main attractions of a number of national parks and monuments. These include Zion National Park, Capitol Reef National Park, the San Rafael Swell, and Canyonlands National Park.

The Kayenta Formation frequently appears as a thinner dark broken layer below Navajo Sandstone and above Wingate Sandstone (all three formations are in the same group). Kayenta layers are typically red to brown in color, forming broken ledges.

Kayenta Formation in Utah

Southeast Utah

In most sections that include all three geologic formations of the Glen Canyon group the Kayenta is easily recognized. Even at a distance it appears as a dark-red, maroon, or lavender band of thin-bedded material between two thick, massive, cross bedded strata of buff, tan, or light-red color. Its position is also generally marked by a topographic break. Its weak beds form a bench or platform developed by stripping the Navajo sandstone back from the face of the Wingate cliffs. The Kayenta is made up of beds of sandstone, shale, and limestone, all lenticular, uneven at their tops, and discontinuous within short distances. They suggest deposits made by shifting streams of fluctuating volume. The thicker beds are indefinitely cross bedded. The shales are essentially fine-grained, very thin sandstones that include lime concretions and balls of consolidated mud. The limestone appears as solid gray-blue beds, a few inches to a few feet thick, and as lenses of limestone conglomerate.

Viewed as a whole, the Kayenta is readily distinguished from the geologic formations above and below it. It is unlike them in composition, color, manner of bedding, and sedimentary history. Obviously the conditions of sedimentation changed in passing from the Wingate Sandstone formation to the Kayenta and from the Kayenta to the Navajo sandstone, but the nature and regional significance of the changes have not been determined. In some measured sections the transition from Wingate to Kayenta is gradual; the material in the basal Kayenta, beds seems to have been derived from the Wingate immediately below and redeposited with only the discordance characteristic of fluviatile sediments. But in many sections the contact between the two formations is unconformable; the basal Kayenta consists of conglomerate and lenticular sandstone that fills depressions eroded in the underlying beds. Likewise, the contact between the Kayenta and the Navajo in places seems to be gradational, but generally a thin jumbled mass of sandstone and shales, chunks of shale and limestone, mud balls, and concretions of lime and iron, lies at the base of the fine-grained, cross bedded Navajo. Mud cracks, a few ripple marks, and incipient drainage channels were observed in the topmost bed of the Kayenta on Red Rock Plateau; and in west Glen Canyon, wide sand-filled cracks appear at the horizon. These features indicate that, in places at least, the Wingate and Kayenta were exposed to erosion before their overlying geologic formations were deposited, are it may be that the range in thickness of the Kayenta thus in part (is) accounted for.

Southwest Utah
The red and mauve Kayenta siltstones and sandstones that form the slopes at base of the Navajo Sandstone cliffs record the record of low to moderate energy streams. Poole (1997) has shown that the streams still flowed toward the east depositing from 150 to 210 m (500 to about 700 feet) of sediment here. The sedimentary structures showing the channel and flood plain deposits of streams are well exposed on switchbacks below the tunnel in Pine Creek Canyon.

In the southeastern part of Zion National Park a stratum of cross bedded sandstone is found roughly halfway between the top and bottom of the Kayenta Formation. It is a "tongue" of sandstone that merges with the Navajo formation east of Kanab, and it shows that desert conditions occurred briefly in this area during Kayenta time. This tongue is the ledge that shades the lower portion of the Emerald Pool Trail, and it is properly called Navajo, not Kayenta.

Fossil mudcracks attest to occasional seasonal climate, and thin limestones and fossilized trails of aquatic snails or worms mark the existence of ponds and lakes. The most interesting fossils, however, are the dinosaur tracks that are relatively common in Kayenta mudstone.

These vary in size, but all seem to be the tracks of three-toed reptiles that walked upright, leaving their tracks in the muds on the flood plains. Unfortunately, so far no bone materials have been found in Washington County that would enable more specific identification.

Apparently during Kayenta time Zion was situated in a climatic belt like that of Senegal with rainy summers and dry winters at the southern edge of a great desert. The influence of the desert was about to predominate, however, as North America drifted northward into the arid desert belt.

Glen Canyon
The alternation of these units generally produces a series of ledges and slopes between the cliffs of the Navajo and Moenave formation. Dinosaur tracks are fairly common in the siltstone, and fresh water mussels and snails occur but are rare. The Kayenta Formation is colored pale red and adds to the splendor of the Vermilion Cliffs. It accumulated as deposits of rivers.

Fossils

Invertebrates

Fishes
The "Kayenta Fish Fauna" is the last one recovered from the Glen Canyon Group sequence and it is delimited mostly to the silty facies of the Lower-Middle Part of the formation. This Fauna is rather scarce and delimited to several concrete locations with proper lacustrine or fluvial deposition, and are also scarce due to preservation bias. Another aspect that can explain the lack of fish fossils found is the use of different research techniques than used on the Chinle Formation.

Chondrichthyes

Actinopterygii

Sarcopterygii

Amphibia

Reptilia

Rhynchocephalia

Testudinatans

Crocodylomorphs

Dinosauria
Indeterminate ornithischian remains located in Arizona, USA. Ornithischian tracks located in Arizona, USA. Indeterminate theropod remains located in Arizona, US. Theropod tracks located in Arizona and Utah, US. Possible theropod tracks located in Arizona, Colorado, and Utah, US.

Pterosauria

Synapsida

Ichnofossils

Plants

See also
 Kayenta, Arizona
 List of dinosaur-bearing rock formations
 List of fossil sites (with link directory)

Footnotes

References
 Geology of Eastern Iron County, Utah by Herbert E. Gregory Utah Geological and Mineral Survey Bulletin No. 37 (1950)
 The San Juan Country – A Geographic and Reconnaissance of Southeastern Utah by Herbert E. Gregory. U.S. Geological Survey Professional Paper No. 188
 Geology Studies, Vol. 15 Part 5 (1968)
 Weishampel, David B.; Dodson, Peter; and Osmólska, Halszka (eds.): The Dinosauria, 2nd, Berkeley: University of California Press. 861 pp. .

External links
 U.S.G.S Lexicon of Colorado Plateau Stratigraphy

 
Sandstone formations of the United States
Siltstone formations
Geologic formations of Arizona
Geologic formations of Colorado
Geologic formations of Nevada
Geologic formations of Utah
Early Jurassic North America
Jurassic Arizona
Jurassic Colorado
Jurassic geology of Nevada
Jurassic geology of Utah
Paleontology in Arizona
Paleontology in Utah
Paleontology in Nevada
Jurassic System of North America
Ichnofossiliferous formations